Cyanoplax hartwegii  is a species of chiton in the family Lepidochitonidae.

Description
These chiton are red-brown, with dark gray girdle. The surface of the valves is commonly grayish green with dark markings.

Distribution and habitat
This species is present in Eastern Pacific (Alaska, Mexico and USA). These molluscs live in intertidal to shallow subtidal zones

References

Chitons